Delta V is an Italian musical group formed in 1995. Its current line-up is composed of Carlo Bertotti, Flavio Ferri, Fefo Forconi and Francesca Tourè. They debuted in 1998 with the album Spazio, and their greatest hits are songs such as "Se telefonando" and "Un'estate fa". Their latest album is Heimat.

Biography

1990-1995

Carlo Bertotti and Flavio Ferri met in school. In 1980, they both became part of Vienna, who in 1990 published the album Giù, senza fare rumore, which was unsuccessful, but in 1992 they published Fiori blu, with Carlo as producer and  Flavio as vocalist. After this, they decided to dedicate themselves entirely to creating music for advertising, until 1995, when MCA Music Italy signed them and created "Straker & Foster", a name inspired by characters in a cult television SF series, "UFO".

1996-2000
In 1996, the pair began collaboration with Roberto Vernetti, a producer. The next year they signed a contract with BMG Memories. The group named themselves Delta V, from "Delta di Venere". Initially, the vocalist was Alice Ricciardi, but she left before the first album was recorded. She was replaced by Francesca Touré.

In early 1998, the group released their first singles, "AL.C" and "Il mondo visto dallo spazio", which helped them spread their name through radio and television, culminating in the release of their debut album, Spazio. It wasn't until their third single, a re-make of Mina's "Se telefonando" that Delta V entered 'heavy rotation' and became one of the "alternative" hits of the summer. In Autumn, a single from the album "Facile" was released to accompany the group's first national tour.

Following the tour, Carlo and Flavio began working on a second album, and decide to undertake new roads, leaving the 'trip-hop' of the debut for a more electronic pop. As a result, Francesca Tourè was replaced with vocalist Lu Heredia.

In 1999, they released their next album, Psychobeat, which was preceded by the single "Sul filo", accompanied by a successful video single "Il primo giorno del mondo", in which Angela Baraldi, Garbo and Mao appear, and a remixed version of "Marta ha fatto un sogno". This album wasn't as successful as their first, and today it is the only Delta V album not to be available.

In Spring 2000, the group did their "Per la bellezza tour", a tour across all Italy. The experience is chronicled in the song "L'infinito", which can be downloaded on-line.

2001-2004
In Autumn 2000, Carlo and Flavio started work on their new album, and recruited a new vocalist, American vocalist Georgeanne (Gi) Kalweit. In May 2001, a new single, "Un'estate fa" was released, and spent more than 20 weeks on the charts. It was accompanied by a music video and the group made numerous television appearances to produce hype for their third album, which was released in October, Monaco '74. They then toured Italy.

Roles were reversed for the fourth album: Carl wrote while Flavio produced. On February 13, 2004, the group released the single "Prendila così" (Lucio Battisti's cover), from their album Le Cose Cambiano, released on February 26. A music video was released, but triggered the ire of Battisti's widow, and was pulled off the air. The group began touring again with a new single "Via da qui".

2005-present
In September 2004, the contract between Delta V and BMG Memories expired, cancelling future tour dates and the release of a third single from the album, "La costruzione di un errore". Gi left the group because of differences with the other members. In June 2005, BMG Memories released the "Delta V collection", a CD and DVD containing all the music videos of the group. The music label consulted neither Carlo nor Flavio, and the selection of tracks was criticized by fans.

Carlo and Flavio signed a 2-album contract with Flavio with Virgin Records, and work began on a new album in Autumn, in which Francesca Tourè returned as a vocalist, and the entry of Fefo Forconi into the Delta V roster.

In February 2006, a new single, "Adesso e mai", was released, and just over a month later, March 31, the fifth album of Delta V was released, Pioggia.Rosso.Acciaio, to critical acclaim, and a new single was released, a cover, "Ritornerai".

In August 2018, a new single, "Domeniche d'agosto" is released with the voice of the new singer Marti (Martina Albertini) and about a year later, the sixth album of Delta V is released, Heimat.

Discography

References

External links
 Official Delta V site
 Baseluna unofficial site
 Delta V - Discography

Italian pop music groups
Musical groups from Milan